In customer interaction management, Customer Interaction Tracker (CIT) is a software and/or process of gathering information about customers interactions against all levels throughout a business. A CIT does not only track customers who have actually bought a product or service, but also keeps track of future prospects and how they interact with sales organisations.

The weak point of a CIT is that it demands that all user interactions be logged into the system. Failing to do so renders analysis uncertain and in worst case useless. Customer privacy laws must be obeyed at all stages.

CIT vs. CRM
The difference between a CRM system and CIT is the approach of what a "customer" actually is. CRM tends to see a customer as a user of a product or service, where CIT focuses on a broader perspective; from potential customer, active customer and terminated customer. By logging all actions a customer do when interacting with you as a company, in every level, on every product/service, trends can be analysed on very specific customer groups.

See also
Customer analytics
Customer intelligence
Web analytics
Web beacon
Website visitor tracking 

Customer relationship management software